SS Linz was an Austro-Hungarian Ocean Liner that hit a mine in the Adriatic Sea 4 miles northwest of the Cape of Rodon, while she was travelling from Fiume, Croatia to Durazzo, Albania under command of Captain Tonello Hugo.

Construction 
Linz was constructed in 1909 at the Lloyd Austriaco shipyard in Trieste, Italy. She was requisitioned by the Austro-Hungarian Navy and used to transport troops and prisoners on Albanian routes.

She had a triple-expansion steam engine driving a single propeller and the engine was rated at 390 nhp (291 kW).

Sinking 
Linz was sunk on 19 March 1918. Linz was on a voyage from Fiume in what is now Croatia, to Durazzo in what is now Albania, escorted by three Austro-Hungarian Navy ships – the Tátra-class destroyer SMS Balaton and the torpedo boats SMS Tb-74 and SMS Tb-98. The ship officially had 1,003 passengers on board, of which 413 were Italian prisoners-of-war being transported to labour camps in Albania. A total of 697 passengers and crew died, including 283 Italian prisoners-of-war and an International Red Cross nurse. Balaton and the two torpedo boats saved 306 passengers and crew. An enemy submarine unsuccessfully attacked Tb-98.

Annotations

References

	
 - Total pages: 448
 

1909 ships
Ships built in Trieste
Steamships of Austria-Hungary
Merchant ships of Austria-Hungary
World War I passenger ships of Austria-Hungary
Ocean liners
Maritime incidents in 1918
World War I shipwrecks in the Adriatic Sea
Ships sunk by mines